was a Japanese photographer. He was the author of 44 books, the most popular of which were Living Crafts of Okinawa (1973), which is a photographic documentary on traditional crafts from Okinawa, The Enduring Crafts of Japan (1968), 
and Hachijo: Isle of Exile (1973).

References

Nihon shashinka jiten / 328 Outstanding Japanese Photographers. Kyoto: Tankōsha, 2000. .

External links
 Additional details about publications

Japanese photographers
1926 births
1991 deaths